Derek Yu is an American independent video game designer, video game artist, and blogger. Yu has designed and co-designed several award-winning games, most famously Spelunky, Aquaria, and Eternal Daughter. He is also notable as a blogger and custodian of the influential TIGSource blog/community about independent video games. He has been called an "indie superstar" and a "genuine icon" of the video game industry.

Life and career
Yu's first exposure to computer games was an Atari 2600 when he was a child. Already in second grade, he and a friend started mapping out simple games on paper, later moving on to making text adventures on the PC and eventually using Klik & Play to make games. After graduating college with a degree in computer science, Yu moved to San Francisco and worked as a freelance illustrator.

In 2007, Yu created satiric run-and-gun freeware game I'm O.K – A Murder Simulator with Alec Holowka and two others, in response to Jack Thompson's "A Modest Video Game Proposal", an open letter regarding gun violence and violent video games that offered $10,000 to charity if videogame developers would dare to make a game depicting videogame developers being killed. The collaboration with Holowka later led to the formation of the company Bit Blot and the release of Aquaria in 2008, which was a big success and won the Seumas McNally award at the 2007 IGF. According to Yu, "Not only did Aquaria sell well enough that [Alec Holowka and I] could continue making games full time, but the positive feedback we received from players and critics also validated us as artists and helped to put to rest our doubts about whether we were making something worthwhile." However, Bit Blot never produced another title, and the last update to the company's website occurred in 2011. Yu and Holowka lived in separate countries, and Holowka cited the long-distance nature of the collaboration as a source of tension during a 2008 interview.

In 2008, Yu released the highly popular and influential roguelike Spelunky, propelling Yu's work to the wider mainstream for the first time. A sequel, Spelunky 2, was released in 2020.

In 2014, Yu designed the card game Time Barons with Jon Perry.

Works

Bibliography

References

External links

Derek Yu's website

1982 births
Living people
American people of Chinese descent
Artists from Pasadena, California
Video game artists
Video game designers
Indie video game developers